Ziyu may refer to:

 Cheng Dechen (died 632 BC), courtesy name Ziyu (子玉), general of Chu
 Zengzi (505–435 BC), courtesy name Ziyu (子輿), disciple of Confucius
 Tantai Mieming (born 512 BC), courtesy name Ziyu (子羽), disciple of Confucius
 Ziyu (Han Clan), head of the House of Han
Zhou Ziyu, retired general of the People's Liberation Army Air Force
 Tzuyu or Chou Tzu-yu (born 1999), Taiwanese singer, dancer, and member of South Korean girl group Twice

See also
 Ziyou (disambiguation)